Archaeological Museum is the oldest museum in Burgas, preserving the cultural and historical heritage of some of the most ancient towns in the present Bulgarian territory - Sozopol (Apollonia), Nessebar (Messambria), Pomorie (Anhialo) and others.

Today the Archaeological museum is one of the four expositions in Regional historical museum Burgas.
The museum was established in 1912 as a private museum of the Debelt Archaeological Society.
The exposition presents collections of archaeological findings related to ancient Thrace, the Greek colonies along the Black Sea coast and the time of the Roman Empire.
In the halls of the museum can be seen exhibits found in archaeological research in the entire Burgas region. Here is the earliest statue ever found on the Bulgarian lands and one of the most complete collections of pre-monetary forms in the country and on the Balkans.

Gallery

References

External links
Archaeological Museum website
Archaeological Museum 

Buildings and structures in Burgas
Archaeological museums in Bulgaria
Museums in Burgas Province
Culture in Burgas